The 2020–21 season was the 124th season of competitive football in Scotland. The domestic season began on 1 August 2020 with the first round of matches in the 2020–21 Scottish Premiership. The start of all other domestic competitions were delayed until at least October 2020 because of the COVID-19 pandemic, and most games were played behind closed doors due to Scottish Government restrictions.

Transfer deals

Due to the effects of the coronavirus pandemic on the football calendar, the summer window for transfers in Scotland ran from 14 July to 5 October. Those dates used the full 12-week period permitted by FIFA, and the governing bodies also authorised clubs outside the Premiership to make loan signings during October 2020.

League competitions

Scottish Premiership

Scottish Championship

Scottish League One

Scottish League Two

Non-league football

Level 5

Level 6

Honours

Cup honours

The Old Firm teams (Celtic and Rangers) were eliminated from both national cup competitions before the semi-final stage, the first time this had occurred since the introduction of the Scottish League Cup 75 years earlier. St Johnstone won both tournaments, becoming the first non-Old Firm side to win a "cup double" since Aberdeen in 1989–90.

Non-league honours

Senior

Junior
East Region

North Region

Individual honours

PFA Scotland awards

SFWA awards

Scottish clubs in Europe

Summary 
Due to scheduling pressures caused by the coronavirus pandemic, qualifying rounds were played over just one tie instead of the usual two-leg format.

* Season in progress

Celtic
UEFA Champions League

Celtic entered the 2020–21 UEFA Champions League in the first qualifying round.

UEFA Europa League

Having lost in the second qualifying round of the Champions League, Celtic entered the Europa League in its third round of qualifying.

Qualifying

Group stage

Rangers
UEFA Europa League

Rangers entered the UEFA Europa League in the second round of qualifying.

Qualifying

Group stage

Knockout Stage

Motherwell
UEFA Europa League

Motherwell entered the UEFA Europa League at the first qualifying round.

Aberdeen
UEFA Europa League

Aberdeen entered the UEFA Europa League in the first qualifying round as fourth-place finishers in the 2019–20 Scottish Premiership, as the 2019–20 Scottish Cup was not completed by the UEFA deadline.

Scotland national team

The Scotland national team qualified for their first major tournament in over two decades (since the 1998 World Cup) by winning through the Euro 2020 play-offs, defeating Israel and Serbia in penalty shootouts.

Women's football
Due to the coronavirus pandemic, the 2020 women's season was declared null and void in July 2020.

A new season (2020–21) started in October 2020 and ended in July 2021; Scottish Women's Football thus returned to the autumn–spring calendar for the first time since 2008–09.

League and Cup honours

Individual honours

SWPL awards

Scottish Women's Premier League

SWPL 1

SWPL 2

UEFA Women's Champions League

Glasgow City
Glasgow City entered the 2020–21 UEFA Women's Champions League in the first qualifying round.

Scotland women's national team

Deaths

13 July: Pat Quinn, 84, Albion Rovers, Motherwell, Hibernian, East Fife and Scotland forward; East Fife manager.
c.13 July: Eddie Beaton, 88, Greenock Morton, Berwick Rangers, Stranraer and Dumbarton forward.
21 July: Hugh McLaughlin, 75, St Mirren, Third Lanark and Queen of the South midfielder.
24 July: David Hagen, 47, Rangers, Hearts, Falkirk, Livingston, Clyde and Peterhead midfielder.
4 August: Willie Hunter, 80, Motherwell, Hibernian and Scotland forward; Queen of the South and Inverness Caledonian manager.
13 August: Jackie Wren, 84, Hibernian, Stirling Albion and Berwick Rangers goalkeeper.
14 August: Tom Forsyth, 71, Motherwell, Rangers and Scotland defender; Dunfermline Athletic manager.
24 August: Pat McCluskey, 68, Celtic, Dumbarton, Airdrieonians and Queen of the South defender and midfielder.
September: Archie Irvine, 74, Airdrieonians midfielder.
19 October: Jim Townsend, 75, Heart of Midlothian, St Johnstone and Greenock Morton midfielder.
23 October: Ebbe Skovdahl, 75, Aberdeen manager.
24 October: Kevin McCarra, 62, journalist.
31 October: Marius Žaliūkas, 36, Heart of Midlothian and Rangers defender.
4 November: Matt Tees, 81, Airdrieonians forward.
15 November: Campbell Forsyth, 86, St Mirren, Kilmarnock and Scotland goalkeeper.
3 December: Bobby Wishart, 87, Aberdeen, Dundee, Airdrie and Raith Rovers forward.
12 December: John McSeveney, 89, Hamilton Academical winger.
December: Joe Frickleton, East Stirlingshire wing half.
24 December: Davie Sneddon, 84, Dundee, Kilmarnock and Raith Rovers inside forward; Kilmarnock and Stranraer manager.
26 December: Chic McLelland, 63, Aberdeen, Motherwell, Dundee and Montrose defender; Montrose manager.
26 December: Jim McLean, 83, Hamilton Academical, Clyde, Dundee and Kilmarnock inside forward; Dundee United manager and chairman.
31 December: Tommy Docherty, 92, Celtic and Scotland right half; Scotland manager.
24 January: Jóhannes Eðvaldsson, 70, Celtic and Motherwell defender.
24 January: Barrie Mitchell, 73, Dunfermline Athletic, Aberdeen and Morton forward.
26 January: Jozef Vengloš, 84, Celtic manager.
28 January: Eddie Connachan, 85, Dunfermline Athletic, Falkirk and Scotland goalkeeper.
January: John Grant, 89, Hibernian, Raith Rovers and Scotland defender.
6 February: Columb McKinley, 70, Airdrie and Dumbarton half-back.
22 February: Jack Bolton, 79, Raith Rovers, Morton and Dumbarton defender.
2 March: Ian St John, 82, Motherwell and Scotland forward; Motherwell manager.
3 March: Willie Whigham, 81, Albion Rovers, Falkirk and Dumbarton goalkeeper.
6 March: Jimmy Stevenson, 74, Hibernian wing half.
7 March: Alastair Alexander, 83, BBC Scotland football commentator. 
20 March: Peter Lorimer, 74, Scotland midfielder.
27 March: Alex Kiddie, 93, Aberdeen, Falkirk, Arbroath, Brechin City, Montrose and Forfar Athletic winger.
24 April: Walter Borthwick, 73, Morton, East Fife, St Mirren, St Johnstone and Dunfermline midfielder; Arbroath manager.
29 April: Frank Brogan, 78, Celtic winger.
7 May: John Sludden, 56, Celtic, St Johnstone, Airdrieonians, Ayr United, Kilmarnock, East Fife, Clydebank, Clyde and Stenhousemuir forward; Bo'ness United, Camelon Juniors and East Stirlingshire manager.
3 June: Alan Miller, 51, St Johnstone goalkeeper.

Notes and references

 
Seasons in Scottish football
S
S